This list of longest caves by country includes the longest-known natural cave per country. To be listed, the caves must have been surveyed to cave surveying standards, and the results published in reliable sources.

List

See also
 List of caves
 List of longest caves
 Speleology

References

Notes

 Lists of caves
Caves
Caves